Ageless is an adjective describing a person or thing whose age cannot be defined, is non-existent, or appears not to change. It can also describe something that has always existed without a precise beginning or an end.

Agelessness can be used as a synonym for immortality; more specifically it refers to eternal youth.

Ageless people
Agelessness can be attributed to individuals whose physical or mental characteristics appear young for their biological age.

The Castrati singers of the Renaissance aged differently from other men due to the lack of testosterone and other hormones, which may have altered their appearance and stature. Specifically, Alessandro Moreschi (1858–1922) was described as having no facial hair and a childish voice and appearance.

Modern examples
The illusion of agelessness seems to be a goal for many individuals, such as Hollywood celebrities, that have been known to strive for, sometimes undergoing extensive and/or risky cosmetic surgeries. Demi Moore, Naomi Campbell, Eminem, "Weird Al" Yankovic, Jamie Lee Curtis, and Madonna are particularly mentioned in the media for their alleged efforts to appear 'forever young'. Television host Dick Clark was often described as "America's Oldest Teenager."  Many of his viewers report difficulty in perceiving typical signs of aging since the 1960s, despite him being born in 1929. The age of Andy Milonakis is also ambiguous to many viewers since he is known to possess a hormone disorder, which allows him to perform the role of a young teenager in his shows despite being much older. Another celebrity who is commonly described as having the appearance of a teenager is the actor Eddie Redmayne, born 1982, due to his virtual lack of beard growth, causing many people to report he appears no older than 20 years of age.

Actress Suzanne Somers attributes her youthful appearance to the use of bioidentical hormone replacement therapy. Her 2006 book Ageless continues the theme of her 2004 book The Sexy Years that restoring hormones (especially sex hormones) to youthful levels is the primary key to an ageless appearance.

Methods to achieve agelessness
Cosmetics exist largely to supposedly aid in attempts to diminish the effects of age. The use of such cosmetics has been known to sometimes create conflicting age indicators (for example, red hair belonging to a wrinkled face), making age determination difficult.

Botox, silicone implants, tummy tucks, facelifts, and nosejobs are examples of surgeries that attempt to remove the signs of aging.  Sooner or later, however, the effects of the passing years do start to show on the body as it endures wear and tear. Scientists all over the world are also working on finding the reason of aging and have developed various theories, however, much more research is needed before this phenomenon can be fully understood and potentially controlled.

Mythology
Gods and goddesses were considered eternal in many ancient mythologies, and were endowed with eternal youth. In Greek mythology, agelessness was achieved by the gods' eating ambrosia (immortality was derived from their blood, ichor); in Norse mythology, by the gods eating golden apples provided by Iðunn; and in Chinese mythology, by the gods consuming the Peaches of Immortality.

Media and fiction

Comics and cartoons
Agelessness is prominent in anime, manga, cartoons, comic books, comic strips, and other illustrated media. Characters and situations are staged in an eternal present where change and causality are considered arbitrary and disposable. Ageless characters in comic books often appear as superheroes, deriving immortal or timeless properties from accelerated or supernatural healing, time travel, interdimensional origin, and other fictional devices. In comics and cartoons, agelessness is sometimes used to preserve continuity in a floating timeline or an episodic format respectively. For example, Mickey Mouse, Bugs Bunny, Garfield and Tom and Jerry are ageless cartoon and comic characters.

Pulp literature
Long-running series of pulp novels can develop ageless characters. The main characters in The Hardy Boys have remained 17 and 18, and have been located approximately in the "present day" since 1926. The same can be said for the Nancy Drew series. Nancy has remained 18 years old for many decades (although she started out at the age of 16).

James Bond is also known by many as an ageless character. Some of his ally characters, including M, Q, Miss Moneypenny, Bill Tanner and Felix Leiter also do not age throughout both the novel and film series, which began in 1953 and 1962 respectively. Ian Fleming, the creator of Bond, tinkered with details of Bond's early life and changed dates to ensure Bond was always the appropriate age for his stories, a practice called retconning.

Fantasy literature
Tolkien's Elves are an iconic example of creatures who are ageless. They are not subject to entropy and decay, unlike Men and the rest of the Middle-earth. Tolkien described his elves as young-looking, yet with some properties of 'wisdom' and experience in their eyes and behaviour; Tolkien also stated that Elves do experience change and aging—not by growing old, but by altering other features of their appearance. The combination of physical youth and immense mental maturity can render the perceived age of an Elf undefinable and alien by mortal standards.

The Aes Sedai of Robert Jordan's Wheel of Time series are described as ageless. A feature of their magical abilities extends life and makes their age difficult to place despite their white hair and physical frailty.

Television and soap operas
On television, the process of a character (usually a child) aging unusually fast has been a common feature in soap operas and is known as Soap Opera Rapid Aging Syndrome or "SORAS". The reverse effect, where characters fail to age at the typical rate they should or in fact become younger, is known by a more recent, opposite term known as de-SORAS.  On the British television show Doctor Who, which involves time travel, all of the Doctor's incarnations appear not to age, except for the First Doctor. It's also implied on The Sarah Jane Adventures episode "Death of the Doctor" that the Doctor's first companions Ian Chesterton and Barbara Wright have never aged since their travels; Also, despite the fact that 10 years of the life of the Pond-Williams passed between "The Eleventh Hour" and "The Angels Take Manhattan", they didn't show any major traits associated with aging. Several characters on ABC's 2011 TV series Once Upon a Time do not age, either through the effects of the Dark Curse or spending time in Neverland; in the case of Hook, both are true. Other characters, such as Rumplestiltskin or Merlin and his apprentice, do not age due to the fact that they possess immortality.

See also

Androgyny
Indefinite lifespan
Life extension
Neoteny
Pedomorphosis
Rejuvenation
Werner syndrome
Neverland, a place in the Peter Pan mythos where people can remain young forever

Human appearance
Ageing